A moroi  (sometimes moroii in modern fiction; pl. moroi) is a type of vampire or ghost in Romanian folklore. A female moroi is called a moroaică (pl. moroaice). In some versions, a moroi is a phantom of a dead person which leaves the grave to draw energy from the living.

Moroi are often associated with other figures in Romanian folklore, such as strigoi (another type of vampire), vârcolac (werewolf), or pricolici (werewolf). As with most concepts in folklore, the exact characteristics ascribed to moroi are variable from source to source. Wlislocki reported a belief that the child of a woman impregnated by a nosferat (a sort of incubus-vampire) would be extremely ugly and covered with thick hair, very quickly becoming a moroi.

They are also sometimes referred to in modern stories as the living offspring of two strigoi. It may also signify an infant who died before being baptized. The origins of the term "moroi" are unclear, but it is thought by the Romanian Academy to have possibly originated from the Old Slavonic word mora ("nightmare") – cf. Russian kikimora. Otila Hedeşan notes that moroi is formed using the same augmentative suffix as strigoi (along with the related bosorcoi) and considers this parallel derivation to indicate membership in the same "mythological micro-system." The "-oi" suffix notably converts feminine terms to the masculine gender as well as often investing it with a complex mixture of augmentation and pejoration.

Fantasy fiction
The concept of "moroi" and "strigoi" have been fictionalized in popular culture, somewhat less often than traditional vampires.

 Vampire Academy by Richelle Mead.  In the Academy series the Moroi are known as mortal vampires with a normal lifespan and death.  They tend to have magical powers, avoid too much sunlight, and drink the blood of humans and human hybrids. The Strigoi in this series are the evil vampires that wish to infect others with their rage and bloodlust.
 In the novel A Matter of Taste in Fred Saberhagen's Dracula series, the gypsy vampire Constantia uses Moroi as a generic word for vampire and refers to Dracula as a Moroi.  This series does not differentiate between Strigoi and Moroi.
 The Vampire: The Requiem role playing game's Ordo Dracul covenant supplement sourcebook features them as a vampire bloodline that is the amalgam of the basic Gangrel and Nosferatu vampire clans.
The supernatural inhabitant of the keep in the 1981 F. Paul Wilson novel The Keep implies that he is a moroi.
 In the Pathfinder Roleplaying Game supplement Blood of the Night, the term Moroi applies to the baseline Vampire template found in the Bestiary in order to distinguish it from the older and more primal Nosferatu Vampire introduced in Blood of the Night.
 Both Moroi and Strigoi appear in the manga Holy Knight, with the difference that Moroi in the manga are not immortal like the Strigoi.
The terms "moroi" and "strigoi" are also used in the Archie Horror comic book series Vampironica, with some redefinitions. Moroi is the term for undead vampires, who rise from the grave after being drained of their blood by another vampire; Strigoi are defined as "living" vampires, humans who are infected with vampirism while still alive.
 The term "moroi" is also used in the YouTube Series Impulse to describe those with the powers of teleportation, although this only applies to two characters, which originate from Romania.
In the video game Resident Evil Village, moroaice are common enemies in Castle Dimitrescu, one of the major locations of the game.

See also
 List of ghosts

References

Romanian legendary creatures
Romanian mythology
Mythological hematophages
Undead
Vampires